The Save Bucharest Union (Romanian: Uniunea Salvaţi Bucureștiul) was a local Romanian political party that later became the Bucharest branch of the Save Romania Union (Romanian: Uniunea Salvați România, USR) operating in Bucharest, Romania. The party was founded on 1 July 2015 by Save Bucharest Association (USB) president and civic activist Nicușor Dan (current Mayor of Bucharest after the 2020 Romanian local elections).

2016 Romanian local election results 

The USB competed in the 2016 local elections in Bucharest and nearly all of its sectors (aside from Sector 5), managing to score the following results:

Bucharest

National

References

Local political parties in Romania
Political parties established in 2015
Registered political parties in Romania